Kentucky Truck Plant is an automobile manufacturing plant owned by Ford Motor Company in Louisville, Kentucky. The  plant on  opened in 1969 and currently employs 8,500 people total. The hourly production workers are represented by The United Automobile, Aerospace, and Agricultural Implement Workers of America, better known as the United Auto Workers (UAW) Local 862, It is located at 3001 Chamberlain Lane in the Northeast corner of the city. Ford also operates another plant in Louisville, the Louisville Assembly Plant.

Production
Recent expansion has almost doubled the floor area (to include a new paint facility, new body shop for aluminum chassis' in 2016, a new stacker, and a new tire production facility) and the final size is yet to be completed. Vehicle output average is 88 vehicles per hour between two assembly lines.

The F-250 to F-550 Ford Super Duty line of trucks is currently built here.  At one time, medium and heavy trucks (semis) and over the road haulers were built here, including the Ford L-Series trucks, which were named for Louisville.

The Kentucky Truck Assembly Plant also manufactures the Ford Expedition (both regular and EL/Max larger models) and Lincoln Navigator (both regular and L versions) alongside the F250, 350, 450 and 550. This additional production began in January 2009.

Current products
 Ford Super Duty (1998-present)
 Ford Expedition & Expedition EL/Max (2009–present)
 Lincoln Navigator & Navigator L (2009–present)

Past
 Ford Excursion (2000–2005)
 Ford B series

See also
 List of major employers in Louisville, Kentucky

Ford factories
Motor vehicle assembly plants in Kentucky
Economy of Louisville, Kentucky
Buildings and structures in Louisville, Kentucky